Karl Damschen  (born 15 July 1942 in Gelsenkirchen, Germany) is an architect working in Switzerland and mainly in Kerala, India. His buildings are grounded in the climatic and historico-cultural conditions of each place, and they are significant for the recognition of the great architectural resources of India.

Education and Career 
In 1963, Damschen began his studies at the Staatliche Ingenieurschule für Bauwesen Kassel (now University of Kassel), which he completed as a grad. Engineer.
After studying with Paul Friedrich Posenenske at the State College of Arts Kassel (now University of Kassel), Damschen obtained his diploma as Architect HbK in 1970. He then  moved to Switzerland, and he worked from 1971 to 1981 as a department head in the Helfer Architekten AG office in Bern. 

In 1982 he founded his own company, Architektur Atelier Damschen in Bern, Switzerland. It was here that he worked on the Ascom office building in Bern. 

In 1985, upon winning a competition for the State College of Technology and Architecture Fribourg (Hochschule für Technik und Architektur Freiburg)  in Switzerland, he, along with his partner Daniel Herren, founded their office Herren + Damschen Architects + Planners AG in Bern. Here they worked on several competitions including the urban planning of Löwenplatz in Luzern   and urban planning of Thörishaus in Switzerland for which they were conferred the highest Award.

India 
In 1976, Damschen embarked on a significant one-year trip by caravan to India and Sri Lanka where he explored the architecture of these countries in detail. This marked the beginning of a lasting relationship with India.
From then on, he spent several months each year in Kerala, the southern state of India where he studied first hand, the traditional construction technologies of highly skilled local carpenters. He stated this in an interview with Indian Architecture & Builder Magazine (IA&B):

His fascination with India led to his decision to work as a consultant architect in Kerala in 1995.  The first hotel project designed by Damschen in Kerala, was the Surya Samudra Beach Garden (Kovalam) in the 1980s, consisting of several traditional wooden houses carefully dismantled and reassembled on site. 

Karl Damschen earned his reputation as an architect-conservator in India by converting several heritage and colonial buildings in South India, especially in the old port city of Kochi, where the Portuguese established their first trading post in India as early as 1502. A good example of this is the renovation and reconstruction of the Old Harbour House, an approximately 300-year-old house built by the Dutch. 

Another Dutch building once used for the spice trade in Jew Town, Kochi, was converted into the Ethnic Passage. The restoration of the Kashi Art Gallery in Fort Kochi is another example.
 
These projects became a paradigm for several hoteliers and property owners and resulted in many of the remarkable heritage houses being saved from destruction. His work has also been significant in the country's recognition of its great architectural resources. Asked about his favorite projects of classical Indian architecture, Karl Damschen said:  In 2001, he was appointed as Conservation Architect to the World Monuments Fund, New York for the restoration of the clock tower of the 450 year old Paradesi Synagogue in the historic Jew Town of Kochi.

Since 2013 he has been working in a partnership with the young Indian architect Krishnan Varma.

Architectural style 

While in Switzerland, Damschen was inspired by master architect Le Corbusier, whose principles of proportion and scale were adopted into his projects. In his view, architecture that uses the same language universally and neglects reference to its context, leads to an enormous architectural impoverishment in cities. In an interview the architect said:
 
His buildings are based on the climatic, historical and socio-cultural conditions of the place. He was influenced by its rich culture of India and introduced carefully selected ornamentation into his architecture. All his projects are planned as an architectural unit that includes the interior and landscape design to ensure overall homogeneity:

Selected projects

Published projects 
 Herbert Ypma: HIP Hotels Beach. Thames and Hudson (Econ), London 2004, 
 Olaf Krüger and Michael Neumann-Adrian:  Zeit für Indien. Bucher-Verlag, Munich 2012, 
 Olaf Krüger, Michael and Edda Neumann-Adrian: Zeit für Kerala, Traumziele im Garten der Götter. Bucher-Verlag, Munich 2006
 Klaus-Peter Gast: Moderne Traditionen : zeitgenössische Architektur in Indien. Birkhäuser, Basel-Boston-Berlin 2007, 
 Inderjit Badhwar, Susan Leong: India chic hotels. bolding books, Singapore 2006. 
 Kim Inglis: Cool hotels India – Maldives – Sri Lanka, Periplus Editions 2004,

References

External links 
 Niraamaya Retreats (ehemals Surya Samudra Beach Garden)
 Old Harbour Hotel
 Taj Garden Retreat
 Paradesi Synagoge in Jew Town, Kochi
 Brunton Boatyard Hotel
 Visalam Palace
 Vismaya House
 Nadulu Hotel – Meriya Heritage in Kaipamangalam, Kerala
 Baymas Lake House

20th-century German architects
1942 births
University of Kassel alumni
Living people
Buildings and structures in India
Synagogues in Kerala
Clock towers in India